The 1968 UCI Track Cycling World Championships were the World Championship for track cycling. The events for the professional men and women's were held in Rome, Italy the other events took place in Montevideo, Uruguay. Eleven events were contested, 9 for men (3 for professionals, 6 for amateurs) and 2 for women between 22 and 27 August 1968.

Medal summary

Medal table

See also
 1968 UCI Road World Championships

References

Track cycling
Track cycling
UCI Track Cycling World Championships by year
International cycle races hosted by Uruguay
International cycle races hosted by Italy
1968 in track cycling